The Future Now is the seventh studio album by Peter Hammill, released on Charisma Records in 1978. It was the first solo album Hammill released following the 1978 breakup of his band Van der Graaf Generator, although he had released numerous solo albums while VdGG were active. The album contains twelve short songs, several in the new wave style of VdGG's last studio album, The Quiet Zone/The Pleasure Dome.

The album cover shows a set of photographs by Brian Griffin, portraying Peter Hammill with half of his moustache and beard shaven.

"If I Could" was re-worked for Hammill's 1984 album The Love Songs.

Track listing

Bonus tracksRecorded live at the All Souls Unitarian Church, Kansas City, on 16 February 1978
"If I Could"
"The Mousetrap (Caught In)"

Personnel 
Peter Hammill – guitars, vocals, keyboards, harmonica, electronics
David Jackson – saxophone (1, 2, 12)
Graham Smith – violin (5, 6, 12)

Technical
Peter Hammill - recording engineer (Sofa Sound, Byfleet, Surrey)
Pat Moran – mixing (Rockfield Studios, Monmouth)
Brian Griffin – photography

References

External links 
Peter Hammill's notes on the album

Peter Hammill albums
1978 albums
Songs against racism and xenophobia
Charisma Records albums